An orthopedic plate is a form of internal fixation used in orthopaedic surgery to hold fractures in place to allow bone healing and to reduce the possibility of nonunion. Most modern plates include bone screws to help the orthopedic plate stay in place.

Historic overview 
Prior to the invention of the orthopedic plate, metal wiring was used to solve the issue of bone fractures until about 1850. It was debated when the first use of this technique was actually made. Supposedly, the first use of this metal wiring was by the ancient Greeks. The first recorded use of metal wiring was is 1755 in a French journal.  It was not until 1870, a Frenchman by the name of Laurent Berenger-Feraud began writing a book on internal fixation and bone fractures called "Traité de l'immobilisation directe des fragments osseux dans les fractures" (a book on direct immobilization of bone fragments of fractures). All the information proved to be beneficial in medical procedures, however one thing lacked, the antiseptic treatments needed to properly administer these techniques. Joseph Lister, a British assistant surgeon who in 1877 tried his techniques on a patient and showed huge success. Carl Hausmann is credited with making the first successful plate using both nickel sheets and screws and creating a method of removal without reopening the wound site in 1886. The years following focused on better surgical techniques and experimentation with other materials. Metals were the most common material for orthopedic plates, until cytotoxic tests were used to determine biocompatibility of metals put into the patients body post operation.

Modern orthopedic plating did not start until the 1950s where Maurice Muller formed AO/ASIF (Association for the study of internal fixation) along with other surgeons to better improve plating techniques. The  purpose of the AO were to better understand bone repair, fracture formation and surgical techniques to gain better results in medical applications.

Materials

Previously used materials 

 Gold
 Ivory Horn 
 Nickel 
 Magnesium 
 Copper Alloys 
 Zinc Alloys
 Silver 
 Lead

Current materials 

 Titanium  
 Medical Grad Steel 
 Cobalt-based Alloys 
 Bioceramics
 Metal Composites 
 Polymers

Classifications of orthopedic plates by usage 
Orthopedic plates are designed based on the bone fracture. While the general design is similar, each plate must be manufactured to not only to reduce the fracture but also fit the contour of the patient's bone.

Protection

Locking plates can be used either to support a locking head screw, or to force bone together at the fracture. Locking head screws can be applied at the fracture, with the orthopedic plate in place to reduce applied force on the bone fracture.

Tension and Compression

Compression plates can be implanted in such a way that it is in tension, forcing the bone together at the fracture. The use of an articulated tension device can also be used to compress the bone together by pulling the compression plate.

Bridging

For fragmentary bone fractures, bridging plates can be used to hold the bone in place when there are no anchor points at the fracture point. Bridging can allow for relative stability along the bone, while not disturbing the bone fragments.

Buttress

Buttress plates, or concave plates, are useful for fractures along concave surfaces. Due to the angle of the bone,  the contour of the concave plate aligns with the bone, providing even compressive force along the fracture.

Applications

Different plate types

Modes of use
Buttress
Neutralization
Bridging
Tension
Compression

See also
List of orthopedic implants
AO Website

References

Orthopedic implants
Orthopedic implants
List